Catocala naganoi is a moth in the family Erebidae first described by Shigero Sugi in 1982. It is found exclusively in Taiwan.

References

naganoi
Moths described in 1982
Moths of Taiwan